Fiona Moverley, (born 25 January 1987, in Hull) is a professional squash player who represented England as a junior. She reached a career-high world ranking of World No. 21 in January 2018.

References

External links 
Fiona Moverley Official Website

English female squash players
Living people
1987 births
People from Hessle
Sportspeople from Yorkshire
Competitors at the 2017 World Games